Rang Mahal School, officially known as Government Rang Mahal High School, formerly known as Rang Mahal Mission School, is a government school located in Lahore, Punjab, Pakistan.

History
Rang Mahal School was founded by Charles William Forman and John Newton on 19 December 1849 as Lahore Mission School. It was the first English-medium school in northern India at the time of its establishment. Initially, the classes of the school were started under a tree with three students of Kashmiri ancestry. The school was later shifted to Rang Mahal in 1852, a mahal that was previously owned by Saadullah Khan, a grand wazir of Emperor Shah Jahan, but was acquired by the mission to establish a school.

The school was nationalized by the Government of Pakistan in 1972. Formerly, it was under the administration of Presbyterian Education Trust.

Alumni
 Syed Fida Hassan
 Kailash Nath Katju

References

Schools in Lahore
1849 establishments in British India